Jacques Darmont was a French film director author of three films in the 1930s.

Filmography 
 1933: 
 1934: The Uncle from Peking
 1936:

External links 
 

French film directors
Year of birth missing
Year of death missing